Keshav High School is a coeducation school in Biratpur, State of Bihar, in India. It is managed by the Department of Education, Bihar. It has classes from the 6th to 10th standard.

References

Madhubani district
High schools and secondary schools in Bihar
Educational institutions in India with year of establishment missing